Gbelce is a municipality and village in the Nové Zámky District in the Nitra Region of south-west Slovakia.

Geography
The village lies at an altitude of 144 metres and covers an area of 26.611 km².

History
In historical records, the village was first mentioned in 1233. The battle of Köbölkút occurred here in 1663. In the 9th century, the territory of Kamenín became part of the Kingdom of Hungary. After the Austro-Hungarian army disintegrated in November 1918, Czechoslovak troops occupied the area, later acknowledged internationally by the Treaty of Trianon. Between 1938 and 1945 Kamenín once more became part of Miklós Horthy's Hungary through the First Vienna Award. From 1945 until the Velvet Divorce, it was part of Czechoslovakia. Since then it has been part of Slovakia.

Population
It has a population of about 2260 people of which 76% is Hungarian, 23% Slovak and 1% Romani.

Facilities
The village has a public library a gym and football pitch.

Genealogical resources
The records for genealogical research are available at the state archive "Statny Archiv in Nitra, Slovakia"

 Roman Catholic church records (births/marriages/deaths): 1868-1895 (parish A)
 Reformated church records (births/marriages/deaths): 1824-1953 (parish B)

See also
 List of municipalities and towns in Slovakia

References

External links
http://www.gbelce.sk
Gbelce – Nové Zámky Okolie
Surnames of living people in Gbelce

Villages and municipalities in Nové Zámky District
Hungarian communities in Slovakia